The equestrian statue of William III is a historic statue in the centre of Queen Square in Bristol, England. It is a Grade I listed building.

The statue of William III by John Michael Rysbrack, cast in 1733 and erected in 1736 to signify Bristol's Whig support of the Crown and Parliament Recognition Act 1689. The original plan was to have a statue of George II.

During World War II the statue was moved to Badminton and subsequently restored and returned to the square in 1948.

The bronze statue is on a Portland ashlar pedestal with a moulded plinth and cornice. It depicts the king in Roman dress.

References

See also

 Grade I listed buildings in Bristol
 List of public art in Bristol

1736 establishments in England
1736 works
Bronze sculptures in the United Kingdom
William 3
Grade I listed buildings in Bristol
Grade I listed monuments and memorials
Royal monuments in the United Kingdom
William 3
William 3, equestrian statue, Bristol
William III
Statues of William III of England